Royal Australasian  may refer to:

 Royal Australasian College of Dental Surgeons
 Royal Australasian College of Medical Administrators
 Royal Australasian College of Physicians
 Royal Australasian College of Surgeons